Orchestral Manoeuvres in Belfast is a 2008 Duke Special live album.

The concert of the same name was held on 3 May 2007 at the Waterfront Hall, featuring Special with the Ulster Orchestra.

Track listing
Overture
Brixton Leaves
Last Night I Nearly Died
Portrait
Wake Up Scarlett
Regarding the Moonlight in Eastbourne
Salvation Tambourine
No Cover Up
I Let you Down
Freewheel

References

Duke Special albums
2008 live albums
V2 Records live albums
Orchestral music